FK Pitu Guli is a football club based in the city Kruševo, North Macedonia. They are currently competing in the Macedonian Third League (South Division).

History
The club was founded in 1945. It was named after local revolutionary leader Pitu Guli.

Ilija Najdoski and Goce Sedloski played for the club.

References

External links
Club info at MacedonianFootball 
Football Federation of Macedonia 

Pitu Guli
Association football clubs established in 1945
1945 establishments in the Socialist Republic of Macedonia
FK